Seok Eun-Mi (born December 25, 1976) is a female South Korean table tennis player who competed in the 2004 Summer Olympics.

She won the silver medal in the women's doubles competition together with Lee Eun-sil.

External links
 

1976 births
Living people
South Korean female table tennis players
Olympic table tennis players of South Korea
Table tennis players at the 2000 Summer Olympics
Table tennis players at the 2004 Summer Olympics
Olympic silver medalists for South Korea
Olympic medalists in table tennis
Medalists at the 2004 Summer Olympics
Table tennis players at the 2002 Asian Games
Asian Games gold medalists for South Korea
Medalists at the 2002 Asian Games
Asian Games medalists in table tennis
21st-century South Korean women